Ranjit Mallick (রঞ্জিত মল্লিক) (born 28 September 1944) is an Indian actor who works mainly in Bengali cinema. He is particularly known for appearing in films such as Interview,  Mouchak, Shatru, Shakha Proshakha, Guru Dakshina, Amader Songsar, Indrajit, Jiban Niye Khela, Nabab, Sathi, Nater Guru, Gyarakal, Chander Bari and Bajimaat. He was also the  Sheriff of Kolkata for the year 2014. He is one of the most anticipated actors of Bengali cinema and has been a part of more than 100 films as of now.

Early life
Ranjit was born on 28 September 1944 in Calcutta, West Bengal, into the Mallick Bari of Bhowanipore (a family belonging to the Vaidya (Baidya) community, which is closely associated with Kolkata's Barat and Gupta families), known for its Durga Puja. His nickname is Ranju.  He studied at the Asutosh College and later at the Syamaprasad College of the University of Calcutta.

Career
Ranjit started his career with Bengali director Mrinal Sen's film Interview (1971). He received the International Best Actor Award from Karlovy Vary for this work. He then become a popular romantic hero in the 1970s and featured in films like Mouchak, Devi Chaudharani, Raag Anuraag, Sayang Siddha. Satyajit Ray cast him in his film Shakha Proshakha, where he played the role of a young man who was caught between values and tradition.

Since the 1984 film Shatru by Anjan Choudhury, he started working on action roles. His daughter, Koel Mallick is also an actress in the Bengali film industry.

Awards 
 Kalakar Awards 
 Veteran Indian Bengali film actor Ranjit Mallick honoured with ‘bbarta award’ for 2017 in recognition of his outstanding contributions to Bengali cinema.
 He was honoured in Kolkata's 16th Tele Cine Awards with the Lifetime Achievement award for his outstanding contributions in Bengali films in 2017.
 Banga Bibhushan in 2012
 Best actor in Karlovy Vary International film festival for Interview(1971)

Filmography

References

External links
 
 Ranjit Mullick Moviebuff.com

Living people
Male actors in Bengali cinema
Asutosh College alumni
Syamaprasad College alumni
University of Calcutta alumni
1944 births
Kalakar Awards winners
Male actors from Kolkata
20th-century Indian male actors
Male bloggers
Indian bloggers
Sheriffs of Kolkata